Unbreakable glass is glass, or glass substitute, which does not display the normal fragility of glass – in general the term is not used to refer to something that is absolutely unbreakable.

In history
A number of ancient writers tell the story of the inventor who approached the Roman emperor Tiberius with his invention of unbreakable glass.  Tiberius asked if anyone else  was aware of the  invention.  When the inventor replied that he was the only person who knew the secret, Tiberius had him killed.  The motivation, according to Reynolds, was to protect the livelihood of the glassmakers.

See also
 Flexible glass
 Toughened glass
 Bulletproof glass
 Safety glass
 Lucite
 Laminated glass
 Gorilla Glass
 Transparent Armor Gun Shield

References

Inventions